MeadWestvaco Corp. v. Illinois Dept. of Revenue, 553 U.S. 16 (2008), is a United States Supreme Court case concerning the extent a state may tax companies that are not based in their state.

Background
Mead, a corporation based out of Ohio, owned Lexis-Nexis, which was based out of Illinois. Mead sold Lexis, and Illinois maintained that Mead must pay them a proportionate capital-gains tax. Illinois asserted that Mead and Lexis were integrated to the extent required for the "unitary business rule". This rule allowed states to tax a proportionate share of the value generated by an interstate corporation.

Opinion of the Court
In a unanimous opinion written by Associate Justice Samuel Alito, the Supreme Court held that the two businesses were not integrated enough to be considered a "unitary business" and Illinois was not allowed to tax Mead on the Lexis sale.

See also
 List of United States Supreme Court cases
 Lists of United States Supreme Court cases by volume
 List of United States Supreme Court cases by the Roberts Court

References

External links
 

United States Supreme Court cases
2008 in United States case law
State taxation in the United States
Capital gains taxes
United States Supreme Court cases of the Roberts Court
United States taxation and revenue case law
Taxation in Illinois